

Qingshui may refer to:

Rivers
 Qingshui River (Guizhou), China, a tributary of the Wu River
 Qingshui River (Qingshai), China
 Qingshui River (Zhangjiakou), a river in Zhangjiakou, China
 Qingshui (Shanxi), China, draining Mount Wutai
 Qingshui River (Taiwan), Taiwan, a tributary of the Lanyang River

Regions
 Qingshui District, district in Taichung City, Taiwan
 Qingshui County, county in Tianshui Prefecture, Gansu, China

Settlements
 Qingshui, Beijing, Mentougou District, China
 Qingshui, Jiuquan, Gansu, China
 Qingshui, Renshou County, Sichuan, China
 Qingshui, Dachu County, Sichuan, China
 Qingshui, Guan County, Shandong, China
 Qingshui, Dawa County, Liaoning, China

People
 Qingshui (monk), Chan Buddhist monk during the Song dynasty

Other
Qingshui Cliff, in Hualien County, Taiwan

See also
Clearwater (disambiguation)
Clear River (disambiguation)
Shimizu (disambiguation), the pronunciation of the same characters in Japanese.

zh:清水